Jacob (Jakob) Frederik Scavenius (12 September 1838 - 26 November 1915) was a Danish landowner and politician. He was a member of Folketinget from 1865 to 1901 and served as Minister of Education from 1880 to 1891.

Early life and education
Scavenius was born on 12 September 1838 in Copenhagen, the son of Peder Brønnum Scavenius and Charlotte S. Meincke (1811–72). He graduated from Metropolitanskolen in 1857 and earned a degree in economics (cand. polit.) in 1867. He then went on a journey to Germany, Austria, Spain and France.

Property
Scavenius inherited Gjorslev in 1868.

Political career
Scavenius was first elected for Folketinget in 1865. He served as Minister of Education from 24 August 1880 to 6 July  1891.

Personal life
Scavenius married Louise Sophie Castonier (4 September 1844 6 November 1920) on 21 June 1865. She was a daughter of lieutenant colonel in the Danish West Indies Frederik Julius Christian Castonier (1804–67) and Annie Catharine O'Ferral (1813–78). He was the father of Harald Scavenius.

He died on 26 November 1915 and is buried at Holtug Cemetery.

Honours
 Vross of Honour, 1864
  Knight in the Order of the Dannebrog, 1878
 Commander of the 2nd Class, 1881
 Commander of the 1st Class, 1884
 Grand Cross, 1888
 Medal of Merit in Fold, 1903

References 

19th-century Danish politicians
19th-century Danish landowners
20th-century Danish landowners
University of Copenhagen alumni
Grand Crosses of the Order of the Dannebrog
Scavenius family
1838 births
1915 deaths
Danish Kultus Ministers
People from Copenhagen
Members of the Folketing